A pace is a unit of length consisting either of one normal walking step (approximately ), or of a double step, returning to the same foot (approximately ). The normal pace length decreases with age and some health conditions. The word "pace" is also used for units inverse to speed, used mainly for walking and running, commonly minutes per kilometer.

The word "pace" is also used to translate similar formal units in other systems of measurement. Pacing is also used as an informal measure in surveying, with the "pace" equal to two of the surveyor's steps reckoned through comparison with a standard rod or chain.

Standardized units

Like other traditional measurements, the pace started as an informal unit of length, but was later standardized, often with the specific length set according to a typical brisk or military marching stride.
 

The Ancient Roman pace was notionally the distance of a full stride from the position of one heel where it raised off of the ground to where it set down again at the end of the step: two steps, one by each foot.

The Byzantine pace (bḗma) was an adaption of the Roman step, a distance of 2½ Greek feet. The double pace (bḗma diploûn), meanwhile, was similar to the Roman unit, comprising 5 Greek feet.

The Welsh pace was reckoned as 3 Welsh feet of 9 inches and thus may be seen as similar to the English yard: 3 paces made up a leap and 9000 a Welsh mile.

See also
Anthropic units
Bematist
Roman & Byzantine units
English & Welsh units
Pacing in surveying
Pace count beads
Horse gait

References

Ancient Roman units of measurement
Human-based units of measurement
Units of length